Soft Focus is the fifth album released by the Norwegian band Euroboys. It peaked at #2 on the Norwegian album charts.

In their end of the year-list, newspaper Aftenposten selected "One-Way Street" as the song of the year. During the music award Alarmprisen in February 2005, the band also got the song of the year-award.

Track listing
"Break Away"
"Sleep 'Til Tomorrow"
"Hold On"
"Fears Be Gone"
"Topanga"
"One-Way Street"
"24 Years"
"Good Enough For Now"
"Pharaoh"
"Soft Focus"
"Crystal Pipeline"

References

2004 albums